Tommy Greer (born 29 December 1983) is an Australian former professional basketball player who is currently the CEO of the South East Melbourne Phoenix of the National Basketball League (NBL). Greer played college basketball for Augusta State University and Nova Southeastern University and played his entire professional career for the Melbourne Tigers.

Basketball career

College
In 2003–04, Greer attended Augusta State University where he was named the Peach Belt Conference and Augusta State Freshman of the Year after he averaged 9.9 points and a team-high 5.3 rebounds per game. Greer then transferred to Nova Southeastern University for 2004–05 and led the team with 11.2 points and 4.9 rebounds per game in a solid sophomore season. He played in all 28 games, starting 27, which led the team for starts and appearances.

Melbourne Tigers
Greer made his NBL debut on 3 September 2005 for Melbourne against the Wollongong Hawks. He won a championship with the Tigers in his rookie season and was part of the championship winning Tigers again in 2008. He was also awarded the Tigers Most Improved Player in 2007–08.

In September 2013, Greer tore his Pectoralis tendon and was sidelined for three months. On 12 April 2014, Greer announced his retirement from basketball to pursue off-court career opportunities.

Post-playing career
In May 2015, Greer was appointed Melbourne United's basketball operations manager. In August 2018, he was appointed general manager of the South East Melbourne Phoenix. He was elevated to the position of CEO for their inaugural season in the NBL in 2019–20.

References

External links
Eurobasket.com profile
Take 40: Tommy Greer
NBL stats
Big V stats

1983 births
Living people
Augusta Jaguars men's basketball players
Australian men's basketball players
Australian expatriate basketball people in the United States
Melbourne Tigers players
Nova Southeastern Sharks men's basketball players
Power forwards (basketball)
Small forwards
Basketball players from Melbourne